Alfred Mardon Mowbray (1849–1915) was an English Gothic Revival architect who practiced in Oxford and Eastbourne from the 1860s to the 1900s.

Career

Mowbray was articled to Charles Buckeridge 1865–70 and assistant to architects including Joseph Clarke and JW Hugall 1870–72. He practiced in Oxford 1872–77, then in Eastbourne until after 1880. He was made a Fellow of the Royal Institute of British Architects in 1881 but lapsed in 1896. He had returned to Oxford by 1890, where he lived in Iffley Road.

Work
SS Mary and John parish church, Cowley Road, Oxford, 1875–83 and tower 1892–93
St Helen's parish church, Berrick Salome: restoration and alterations, 1891
St Helen's parish church, Albury: restoration, 1891
Mission Church, Murcott, 1895
St Katherine's School, Wantage, 1897
St Ebbe's parish church, Oxford: upper part of tower, 1904
St Michael and All Angels parish church, Summertown, Oxford, 1909 (unfinished)

References

Sources

1849 births
1915 deaths
19th-century English architects
English ecclesiastical architects
Gothic Revival architects
Architects from Oxford
People from Eastbourne
Architects from Oxfordshire
Architects from Sussex
Fellows of the Royal Institute of British Architects